Brøndbo is a Norwegian surname. Notable people with the surname include:

Bjarne Brøndbo (born 1964), Norwegian vocalist
Eskil Brøndbo (born 1970), Norwegian drummer
Rune Brøndbo (born 1968), Norwegian jazz musician and composer

Norwegian-language surnames